Renée Gertrude Taylor  (born 1929), known mononymously as Renée, is a New Zealand feminist writer and playwright. Renée is of Māori (Ngāti Kahungunu), Irish, English, and Scottish ancestry, and has described herself as a "lesbian feminist with socialist working-class ideals". She wrote her first play, Setting the Table, in 1981. Many of her plays have been published, with extracts included in Intimate Acts, a collection of lesbian plays published by Brito and Lair, New York.

Early life and education
Renée was born in Napier, New Zealand. She attended Greenmeadows School in Hawke's Bay.

I liked school. I got a lot of approval there. Except when it came to sport. I was uninterested. I preferred to read...My interest in theatre started at school. They used to have a concert every year. The first half would be items by individuals or groups and the second half would be a play. I was in two or three plays and I loved it. I loved being someone else even if it was only for a short time.

Renée left school at the age of 12 to work in the local woollen mills and then a printing factory.

In 1979, Renée completed a Bachelor of Arts at Auckland University. Completed over ten years, much of her B.A. was gained through extramural study from Massey University.

Career
Renée is a pioneering figure for women in the New Zealand theatre landscape. Fellow New Zealand playwright, Lorae Parry, has said:

Renée opened the stage door and strode in, announcing her arrival and standing centre stage. She opened the door with a bang, not with a whimper and many of us followed. It was time. Someone needed to do it. Renée had the guts.

Renée began writing short stories, reviews and humorous columns for newspapers when her three children were young. She also began acting in the Napier Repertory Theatre. For twenty years she directed plays for a number of theatrical groups and schools in the Hawke's Bay area.

Renee's attendance at the United Women's Convention in Wellington in 1975 was an important experience. The convention enabled her to recognise that "...a lot of the things I thought and felt resentful about were things other women thought and felt too." A feminist perspective became an important part of her theatre work and writing from that point onwards.

In 1979, Renée relocated to Auckland to complete her B.A. at the University of Auckland. During this time, she worked as a cleaner at Auckland's Theatre Corporate. Six years later, she returned to Theatre Corporate as Playwright in Residence. Following her graduation, Renée worked at a secondary school teaching English and Drama. Renée began writing her first play Setting The Table on New Year's Day in 1981, the first draft of which was completed in five days. In a 1982 interview with New Zealand feminist magazine Broadsheet, Renée said she “wanted to write a play that showed women as intelligent,  and strong. I wanted to write a play with very good parts for women — that also put forward some political themes.”

Renée went on to many write plays which feature women in leading roles and humanise working-class people.

Renée was invited to attend the First International Women Playwrights Conference in New York in October 1988. She was one of three keynote speakers. She also attended the Pacific Writers Conference in London and took part of in a reading tour of Britain and Europe.

Renée has been described as "one of the 'first wave' of waahine playwrights" whose representation of female characters showed the complexity of Māori women's lives and more accurately represented their varied life experiences.

Of her background, Renée has said:

My upbringing and conditioning is largely European, but I have an instinctive love of Māori ritual. Even though I don't understand the language, I feel at home. But I also feel that because of my upbringing, I'll always be an outsider in both worlds. It's got a lot to do with class, too – my roots are rural. Sometimes I feel alienated from the European world, and sometimes from the Māori world; because I sometimes feel inadequate in both of them.

Renée chose to use only her first name as her professional name "simply because it was the name her mother gave her, and the only one she really felt was hers." Of this decision she has said, "I didn't realise I was making a political statement but that's how it is seen, I think."

Some of Renée's best known plays form a trilogy, beginning with Wednesday to Come (1984) which shows the effect on a family of the 1930s Great Depression in New Zealand. The characters in Wednesday to Come include three generations of women in one family. Pass It On (1986) follows the two children in Wednesday to Come now that they have grown up and married. It celebrates the role of working-class women in the 1951 New Zealand waterfront dispute. Jeannie Once (1991), is a prequel to Wednesday to Come in that it focusses on the past of Wednesday to Come'''s Granna and her life as a seamstress in Victorian Dunedin. One of the characters in Jeannie Once is a Māori servant, Martha, who ends up being committed to an asylum. Jeannie Once features elements of Music Hall.

In October 2017, Renée published a memoir entitled These Two Hands, published by Mākaro Press.

Awards
In the 2006 Queen's Birthday Honours, Renée was appointed an Officer of the New Zealand Order of Merit, for services to literature and drama.

1986 Queen Elizabeth II Arts Council Literary Fund Playwrights Award
1989 Roberts Burns Fellow, University of Otago
2013 Creative New Zealand Te Waka Toi Awards, Ngā Tohu ā Tā Kingi Ihaka | Sir Kingi Ihaka Awards recognising lifetime contribution
2017 Playmarket Award, a $20,000 prize recognising a playwright who has made a significant artistic contribution to theatre in New Zealand
2018 Fiction Award, New Zealand Prime Minister's Awards for Literary Achievement

Plays
1981 Setting the Table1982 Secrets1982 Breaking Out1982 What Did You Do in the War, Mummy? Broadsheet revue
1983 Dancing1983 The MCP Show1983 Asking for It Broadsheet revue
1985 Wednesday to Come1985 Groundwork1986 Pass It On1987 Born to Clean1990 Touch of the Sun1990 Missionary Position1991 Jeannie Once1992 Tiggy Tiggy Touch Wood1993 Form1993 Heroines, Hussies and High, High Flyers2010 Shall We Gather at the RiverDates Unknown: Pink Spots and Mountain Tops, Dreaming in Ponsonby, Te Pouaka (The Glass Box),

Fiction
1987 Finding Ruth1990 Willy Nilly1993 Daisy and Lily1995 Does This Make Sense to You?1997 The Snowball Waltz1997 I Have to Go Home2002 The Skeleton Woman: A Romance2005 Kissing Shadows2019 The Wild Card''

References

1929 births
Living people
Lesbian feminists
20th-century New Zealand dramatists and playwrights
New Zealand women dramatists and playwrights
University of Auckland alumni
People from Napier, New Zealand
New Zealand Māori writers
New Zealand Māori feminists
Officers of the New Zealand Order of Merit
Ngāti Kahungunu people
New Zealand socialist feminists
21st-century New Zealand dramatists and playwrights
20th-century New Zealand women writers
21st-century New Zealand women writers
New Zealand LGBT dramatists and playwrights
Lesbian dramatists and playwrights